The Morgan 32 is an American sailboat that was designed by Ted Brewer and Jack Corey and first built in 1980.

The Morgan 32 is a scaled-down development of the Morgan 38.

The design was developed into the Morgan 321, Morgan 322 and Morgan 323 in 1983.

Production
The Morgan 32 was built by Morgan Yachts in the United States from 1980 to 1986, but it is now out of production.

Design
The Morgan 32 is a recreational keelboat, built predominantly of fiberglass, with wood trim. It has a masthead sloop rig with aluminum spars, a raked stem, a reverse transom, a skeg-mounted rudder controlled by a wheel and a fixed fin keel. It displaces  and carries  of lead ballast.

The boat is fitted with a Japanese Yanmar 2GM20  diesel engine.

The galley is located on the port side, at the bottom of the companionway stairs and features a two-burner alcohol stove and oven, a  icebox and a single sink with foot-pumped water. The head is located forward, just aft of the bow "V"-berth. Additional sleeping accommodation is provided by settees in the main cabin and a aft double berth. One cabin quarter berth also serves as a seat  for the navigation table. The cabin trim is teak with ash striping on the ceiling.

Ventilation is provided by six opening ports, plus opening hatches in the head and bow cabin.

The mainsheet is of a 6:1, mid-boom configuration and attaches at the bridge deck. The cockpit has two genoa winches and the genoa has inboard tracks. There are also two halyard winches.

Original factory optional equipment included jiffy reefing, a bow anchor roller and pressure water.

The design has a Portsmouth Yardstick racing average handicap of 86.0.

See also
List of sailing boat types

Similar sailboats
Bayfield 30/32
Beneteau 323
C&C 32
Columbia 32
Douglas 32
Hunter 32 Vision
Mirage 32
Nonsuch 324
Ontario 32
Ranger 32
Watkins 32

References

Keelboats
1980s sailboat type designs
Sailing yachts
Sailboat type designs by Edward S. Brewer
Sailboat type designs by Jack Corey
Sailboat types built by Morgan Yachts